The Colonist was a newspaper published in Nelson, New Zealand. It was published from 1857 to 1920.

References 

Defunct newspapers published in New Zealand
Nelson, New Zealand
Publications established in 1857
1857 establishments in New Zealand
Publications disestablished in 1920
1920 disestablishments in New Zealand